Central Operations (abbreviated CO) was a major directorate of the London Metropolitan Police Service that provides operational support to the rest of the service. It was commanded by Assistant Commissioner Mark Rowley, formerly Chief Constable of Surrey Police. In 2012 Central Operations (CO) merged with the Specialist Crime Directorate (SCD) to form Specialist Crime & Operations (SC&O)

Units
There were many units within Central Operations.

Operational Support:
Air Support Unit
Dog Support Unit
Film Unit
Marine Policing Unit
Mounted Branch

See also
 Territorial Operations, the predecessor to Central Operations

References

External links
Central Operations website

Metropolitan Police units